Douglas Harbor is a harbor off the coast of Douglas Island in Juneau, Alaska.

In the 2002 regular election, Juneau-area voters approved the issue and sale of bonds totaling $15 million for improving the borough's harbors, utilities, and parks systems.  $7.1 million was allocated for the harbors, including Douglas.

In January 2009, winter weather caused a boat in the harbor to sink.

See also
Douglas, Alaska

References

External links
Photograph
About Douglas Harbor at Juneau.org

Geography of Juneau, Alaska
Ports and harbors of Alaska